Khavn De La Cruz (also known as KHAVN) is a Filipino poet, singer, songwriter, pianist and filmmaker. 
He is the founder and festival director of MOV International Film, Music and Literature Festival. Considered the father of Philippine digital filmmaking, Khavn has made 47 features and 112 short films since 1994. His 46th feature, Ruined Heart, is lensed by Christopher Doyle and features Tadanobu Asano and Nathalia Acevedo. It premiered in official competition at the 27th Tokyo International Film Festival.

Works
Ultraviolins, a collection of 14 short stories (2008)

References

External links

1970 births
Living people
Filipino film directors
People from Quezon City
Postmodern writers